New Road Team Football Club (NRT FC) (better known by its abbreviation NRT Football Club) is a Nepalese multi-sports club, widely known for its football achievements. The club is based in Tripureshwor, Kathmandu. They compete in the Martyr's Memorial A-Division League.

History

NRT was established in 1991 BS (1934 AD). Besides sports, the club was also active in mobilizing youth against the autocratic Rana regime. NRT is the oldest existing club in the Nepal.

For the season of 2013–2014 club decided not to participate in league and other domestic competitions.
NRT were automatically demoted 'B' Division for not registering their team at ANFA for league season.

In June 2022, in a statement issued by New Road Team's general secretary Narendraman Shrestha, the club had participate in the inaugural edition of Tuan Yang Terut Cup (TYT Cup) in Penang, Malaysia, organized by Melaka United, in the pre-season targeting the upcoming A-Division league. The club then roped in few new faces including SAARC quota player Nicholas Fernandes from India and set on the pre-season tour to Malaysia and Thailand.

The club began their journey with a defeat to Indonesian Liga 2 side Karo United by 5–1. They again suffered a heavy defeat, by 5–0, in their second match against Malaysia Super League side Penang.

Players

Current squad

Current Technical Squad

Performance in AFC competitions
 Asian Club Championship: 2 appearances
1986: Qualifying Stage
1997: First Round

AFC President's Cup: 1 appearance
2010: Group Stage

League finishes

Honours

National 
 Martyr's Memorial A-Division League:
 Champions: 1960–61, 1962–63, 1974–75, 1978–79, 1995–96
Simara Gold Cup:
 Champions: 2078 B.S.
Nepal National League Cup:
Champions: 1985
Mahendra Gold Cup:
Champions: 1998

Invitational
Sikkim Governor's Gold Cup:
Champions:  2007

Notes

References

External links

Football clubs in Nepal
1934 establishments in Nepal